The Milan Triennial VIII was the Triennial in Milan sanctioned by the Bureau of International Expositions (BIE) on the 11 June 1946.
Its theme was The House. 
It was held at the Palazzo dell'Arte and ran from 31 May 1947 to 14 September 1947.

References 

1947 in Italy
Tourist attractions in Milan
World's fairs in Milan